The 2011 Nigerian House of Representatives elections in Taraba State was held on April 9, 2011, to elect members of the House of Representatives to represent Taraba State, Nigeria.

Overview

Summary

Results

Bali/Gassol 
PDP candidate Haruna Manu won the election, defeating other party candidates.

Jalingo/Yorro/Zing 
LP candidate Ibrahim Yakubu Saleh won the election, defeating other party candidates.

Karim Lamido/Lau/Ardo-Kola 
PDP candidate Jerimon S Manwe won the election, defeating other party candidates.

Sardauna/Gashaka/Kurmi 
PDP candidate Ibrahim Tukur El-Sadu won the election, defeating other party candidates.

Takuma/Donga/Ussa 
PDP candidate Albert Tanimu Sam Tsokwa won the election, defeating other party candidates.

Wukari/Ibi 
PDP candidate Ishaika Mohammad Bawa won the election, defeating other party candidates.

References 

Taraba State House of Representatives elections
2011 elections in Nigeria